"Lecture Demonstration" is a science fiction short story by American writer Hal Clement.  It was first published in Astounding: The John W Campbell Memorial Anthology in 1973.

Plot introduction
The story is set on the planet Mesklin as used in the author's novel Mission of Gravity, but in an earlier period when the College established by the Terrestrials is still being set up and the teachers as well as the students are still learning.

Plot summary

Dr LaVerne, a teacher with the College, takes a party of Mesklinite students on a geological expedition. Whilst examining a layer of rock, it collapses. Teacher and students fall into a cavern. They are unable to climb out;  the limiting factor is time, as the teacher is enclosed in a suit with a finite oxygen supply.

The students and teacher discuss various possibilities until they realise that they can raise the melting point of the surrounding ammonia 'snow' to the point where it solidifies. They climb out to safety.

1973 short stories
Science fiction short stories